William Lehane (18 June 1890 – 24 March 1958) was an Irish Gaelic footballer who played as a forward for club side Macroom and was a member of the Cork senior football team from 1909 until 1913.

Honours

Macroom
 Cork Senior Football Championship: 1909, 1910, 1912, 1913

Cork
 All-Ireland Senior Football Championship: 1911
 Munster Senior Football Championship: 1911

References

1890 births
1958 deaths
Macroom Gaelic footballers
Cork inter-county Gaelic footballers
Winners of one All-Ireland medal (Gaelic football)
20th-century Irish medical doctors
People from Macroom